Eye Green is a hamlet in the unitary authority of Peterborough, in the ceremonial county of Cambridgeshire, England. It lies north of Eye and south of Crowland.

Eye Green Nature Reserve abounds the A47 Trunk Road, which separates Eye Green from its sister village of Eye. North of the nature reserve is a geological Site of Special Scientific Interest, Eye Gravel Pit.

See also
Eye Green railway station

References

External links

Villages in Cambridgeshire
Geography of Peterborough